The Public Health (Prevention and Treatment of Disease) Act 1913 (3 & 4 Geo 5 c 23) was a public act of the parliament of the United Kingdom relating to public health.

Among other things, the act authorised county boroughs and county councils to make arrangements for the treatment of tuberculosis.

References 

United Kingdom Acts of Parliament 1913
Public health in the United Kingdom